Ferdinand Johann Franz Blumentritt (10 September 1853, Prague – 20 September 1913, Litoměřice) was an Austrian teacher, secondary school principal in Leitmeritz, lecturer, and author of articles and books in the Philippines and its ethnography. He is well known in the Philippines for his close friendship with the writer and Propagandist José Rizal, and the numerous correspondence between the two provide a vital reference for Rizal historians and scholars, including his last letter from prison before the execution.

Biography
Blumentritt was born in Prague (now the Czech Republic, then the capital of Kingdom of Bohemia in the former Austrian Empire).

Blumentritt wrote extensively about the Philippines, although he never visited the islands, corresponding with the then Filipino student and writer José Rizal, who later became a national hero. Blumentritt's relationship with Rizal began as early as July 1886. Blumentritt became one of Rizal's closest confidants although they met only once. He translated a chapter of the latter's first book, Noli Me Tangere, into German and wrote the preface to Rizal's second book, El filibusterismo, although he was against its publication as he believed that it would lead to Rizal's death. These two novels are commentaries disguised as fiction which angered both the Catholic Church and the Spanish colonial government, and which eventually led to Rizal's 1896 trial and execution. Before the execution in Manila, Rizal wrote his final letter for Blumentritt. Blumentritt reportedly cried after receiving the letter.

Alongside Rizal, Blumentritt was a significant contributor to the publication La Solidaridad, published by Filipino expatriates from 1889 to 1895 as a voice for advocacy of political reforms in the Philippines. From 1900, Blumentritt was a member of the Berlin Society for Anthropology.

Blumentritt died in Litoměřice, Bohemia. He is memorialized in the Philippines by numerous public parks and streets. Among them are Blumentritt Road, Blumentritt LRT Station, Blumentritt PNR Station, the Blumentritt Market in Metro Manila and the Blumentritt Street in Naga City and Tuguegarao. His relations with Rizal also caused the twin status of the Czech town of Litoměřice with the Philippine towns of Calamba (Rizal's birthplace) and Dapitan (where Rizal was initially exiled).

Main works 
 Alphabetisches Register der Reifeprüfungsvorschriften. Leitmeritz, 1909 	
 Alphabetisches Verzeichnis der gebräuchlichsten Aquarellfarben. Leitmeritz, 1910 	
 America and the Philippines (1900) 	
 Die Chinesen auf den Philippinen. Leitmeritz, 1879 	
 Diccionario mitologico de Filipinas. Madrid, 1895 	
 Einige Manuskripte aus dem 17. und 18. Jahrhundert. Leitmeritz, 1904 	
 Einiges über Juan Valera. Leitmeritz, 1894 	
 Introduction to the Noli me tangere of Rizal. Barcelona, 1889 	
 Introduction to the Sucesos de las islas Filipinas of Antonio de Morga, annotated by Rizal. Paris, 1890 	
 Die Erdbeben des Juli 1880 auf den Philippinen 	
 Die Goldfundstellen auf den Philippinen und ihre Ausbeutung 	
 Holländische Angriffe auf die Philippinen im 16., 17., und 18. Jahrhundert. Leitmeritz, 1880 	
 Das Kaiserbild. Leitmeritz, 1899 	
 J. C. Labhart-Lutz. Ein Nachruf. Leitmeritz, 1889 	
 Die Philippinen. Eine übersichtliche Darstellung der ethnographischen und historischpolitischen Verhältnisse des Archipels. Hamburg, 1900 	
 Die Sprachgebiete Europas am Ausgange des Mittelalters, verglichen mit den Zuständen der Gegenwart. Prague, 1883 	
 Strömungen und Gezeiten an der Küste von Mindanao. 	
 Der "Tratado Anonimo" über den Aufstand der Cumuneros gegen König Carl V. Leitmeritz, 1878 	
 Versuch einer Ethnographie der Philippinen.[=Towards an ethnography of the Philippines] Gotha, 1882. Translated from the German into English by Marcelino N. Maceda. 	
 Vocabular einzelner Ausdrücke und Redensarten, welche dem Spanischen der philippinischen Inseln eigenthümlich sind. Leitmeritz, 1882, 1883–1884|8, 1885|5.

Literature 
 Jindřich Tomas: Jose Rizal, Ferdinand Blumentritt and the Philippines in the New Age. The City of Litomerice: Czech. Publishing House Oswald Praha, 1998.
 Johann Stockinger: „Ich interessiere mich von jeher nur für die spanischen Colonien“ – Neueste Erkenntnisse für die Blumentritt-Forschung aus der Korrespondenz mit Hugo Schuchardt. (Wien, 1998)
 The Dapitan Correspondence of Dr.Jose Rizal and Dr. Ferdinand Blumentritt. Compiled by Romeo G. Jalosjos. City government of Dapitan: Philippines, 2007. .
 Harry Sichrovsky: Der Revolutionär von Leitmeritz. Ferdinand Blumentritt und der philippinische Freiheitskampf . Wien: Österr. Bundesverl., 1983. 
 (translation) Harry Sichrovsky: Harry Sichrovsky: Ferdinand Blumentritt: An Austrian Life for the Philippines. Manila, 1987.
 Lea Blumentritt-Virághalmy, Egy szudétanémet nagypolgár európai és délkelet-ázsiai kapcsolathálója. Szentendre, 1999) /Resume/
 Lea-Katharina Steller (née Blumentritt-Virághalmy): Ferdinand Blumentritt /1853-1913/. In: Series of the Collections for Research into Sudeten German Minority. I.. Szentendre, 2006. Szentendre, 2006.
 Lea-Katharina Steller (née Blumentritt-Virághalmy), Ferdinand Blumentritt In: Unitas, a scholarly publication of the University of Santo Tomas. Ed. I. C. Abaño OP. Manila, 2006/Dezember.
 Harry Sichrovsky: "Blumentritt and Rizal. The Austrian Friend behind the Philippine National Hero." Austromedia Corp, Makati 2011 (152 pages), 
 Maria Zeneida Angara Collinson, et al.: Philippine-Austria Relations: 500 years. Embassy of the Republic of the Philippines in Austria, 2017.

References

Further reading
 Harry Sichrovsky. Ferdinand Blumentritt: an Austrian life for the Philippines : the story of José Rizal's closest friend and companion. s.n.; 1987. .

External links 

 
 
 Rizal-Blumentritt Friendship maintained by the University of Vienna
 The Complete Jose Rizal, Filipiniana.net

1853 births
1913 deaths
Writers from Prague
People from the Kingdom of Bohemia
19th-century Austrian people
Austrian ethnographers
Austrian non-fiction writers
Austro-Hungarian writers
Austrian educators
Charles University alumni
German Bohemian people
Austrian people of German Bohemian descent
People of Hungarian German descent
Czech people of Hungarian descent
Austrian people of Hungarian descent